Gortnahey, also transliterated as Gortnaghey, is a townland and small hamlet in County Londonderry, Northern Ireland. It is 5 km northwest of Dungiven and 13 km south of Limavady. In the 2001 Census its population was 285. It is situated within Causeway Coast and Glens district.

Features
Altahullion Hill lies west of the hamlet, and there are extensive views to the east over the River Roe to Benbradagh. Gortnahey has grown as two clusters of housing, with an area of mainly public housing at Gortnahey Road and private housing at Beech Road. There is a primary school and Roman Catholic church, but there are no commercial services.  There are proposals to provide a community hall and two retail units on the site of the existing McCartney Memorial Hall.

References

Villages in County Londonderry
Causeway Coast and Glens district